Get Some may refer to:

 Get Some (album), by Snot
 "Get Some" (Chevelle song)
 "Get Some" (Lykke Li song)
 "Get Some", a song by E.Y.C. (with Boo-Yaa T.R.I.B.E.)
 Get Some (2008 film)